Backroads is the fifth studio album by American country music artist Ricky Van Shelton. The first three singles released from the album, "Rockin' Years" (a duet with Dolly Parton), "I Am a Simple Man", and "Keep It Between the Lines" were all number-one hits. "After the Lights Go Out" and "Backroads" charted at numbers 13 and 2, respectively. The album was certified platinum by the RIAA on December 6, 1991.

Track listing

Personnel
Musicians

 Eddie Bayers - drums
 Mark Casstevens - acoustic guitar
 Richard Dennison - background vocals
 Jerry Douglas - dobro
 Glen Duncan - fiddle
 Paul Franklin - steel guitar
 Sonny Garrish - steel guitar
 Steve Gibson - electric guitar, mandolin
 Rob Hajacos - fiddle
 Roy Husky Jr. - upright bass
 Carl Jackson - background vocals
 Albert Lee - electric guitar
 Randy McCormick - piano
 Terry McMillan - harmonica
 Jimmy Mattingly - fiddle
 Louis Dean Nunley - background vocals
 Jennifer O'Brien - background vocals
 Mark O'Connor - fiddle
 Dolly Parton - duet vocals on "Rockin' Years"
 Matt Rollings - piano
 Hal Rugg - steel guitar
 John Wesley Ryles - background vocals
 Randy Scruggs - acoustic guitar
 Ricky Van Shelton - acoustic guitar, lead vocals
 Howard Smith - background vocals
 Harry Stinson - background vocals
 Steve Turner - drums
 Paul Uhrig - bass guitar
 Bruce Watkins - acoustic guitar
 Biff Watson - acoustic guitar
 Dennis Wilson - background vocals
 Curtis Young - background vocals

Production
Compiled from liner notes.

 Steve Buckingham — production
 Marshall Morgan — engineering (except "Rockin' Years")
 Gary Paczosa — engineering ("Rockin' Years" only)
 Denny Purcell — mastering
 Gary Smith — production ("Rockin' Years" only)

Charts

Weekly charts

Year-end charts

References

1991 albums
Ricky Van Shelton albums
Columbia Records albums
Albums produced by Steve Buckingham (record producer)